KarabakhOpen.com (in Armenian Բաց Ղարաբաղ) was a prominent online newspaper in Nagorno-Karabakh Republic on www.Karabakh-Open.com It was established in 2005 by Naira Hairumyan and operated until 2008 becoming the only online independent news source at the time from within the newly established republic. 

Karabakh Open was trilingual with news in Armenian,  English and Russian. It stopped activity on 28 June 2008.

Republic of Artsakh culture
Asian news websites
European news websites